Vladimirsky Municipal Okrug is a municipal okrug in Tsentralny District, one of the eighty-one low-level municipal divisions  of the federal city of St. Petersburg, Russia. As of the 2010 Census, its population was 59,065, up from 57,213 recorded during the 2002 Census.

Geography
The municipal okrug borders with Nevsky Avenue in the north, Ligovsky Avenue in the south, Gorokhovaya Street in the west, and with the Fontanka River in the north.

Economy
Rossiya airline has its head office in the municipal okrug.

Architecture
Places of interest include the Vladimirskaya Church and the Corinthia Hotel.

References

Notes

Sources

Tsentralny District, Saint Petersburg